Huariaca District is one of thirteen districts of the province Pasco in Peru.

See also 
 Pichqa Pukyu

References

External links
Huariaca y el San Juan Bautista